Hekkingen Lighthouse is a coastal lighthouse located in the Malangen fjord in the municipality of Lenvik in Troms og Finnmark county, Norway. It was first lit in 1859. The lighthouse was listed as a protected site in 2000.

See also

Lighthouses in Norway
List of lighthouses in Norway

References

External links

 Norsk Fyrhistorisk Forening 

Lighthouses completed in 1859
Lighthouses in Troms og Finnmark
Listed lighthouses in Norway
Senja